Nalin Mishra (born 20 December 1995) is an Indian cricketer. He made his Twenty20 debut on 18 January 2021, for Uttar Pradesh in the 2020–21 Syed Mushtaq Ali Trophy.

References

External links
 

1995 births
Living people
Indian cricketers
Uttar Pradesh cricketers
Place of birth missing (living people)